Club The Strongest is a Bolivian professional football club based in La Paz, that currently plays in the Bolivian Primera División.

Founded in 1908, their team colours are yellow and black. Although they have a home ground, Estadio Rafael Mendoza, (capacity: 15,000), they play most of their games at the Estadio Hernando Siles, Bolivia's national ground (capacity: 42,000). The club is the oldest active football club in Bolivia and the only team to have played continuously in the country's top division for longer than a century.

The club was well represented in the Bolivian squad at the 1994 FIFA World Cup, the last such tournament in which the national team participated, by Marcelo Torrico, Gustavo Quinteros, Óscar Sánchez and José Melgar.

History

Early Years 
The Strongest was founded on 8 April 1908 by a group of 12 students and were originally known as "The Strong Football Club", before later becoming "The Strongest Football Club", or El Club Mas Fuerte in Spanish. Its first President and founder was José León López Villamil. Its first championship was in 1911, well before any of the current Bolivian teams had even been created.

In 1930, The Strongest became the first and only Bolivian team to win a League championship with no goals scored against them. The same year, The Strongest inaugurated the Estadio Hernando Siles, with a 4–1 victory against its classical rival (at the time), Universitario.

It is the only football team in the world to have a battle named after it. In the Chaco War (1932–1935) the players, staff and members of the club, which numbered around 600, enlisted in the Bolivian Army. A division largely composed of these "Stronguistas" played a vital part in the Bolivian Army's most important victory. As a result of that, the battle is named "Batalla de Cañada Strongest" in Bolivian history books.

The club was one of the founding members of the first professional Bolivia league in 1950, with all 9 clubs being from La Paz. With the 1952 Torneo Interdepartamental, the club won its first professional league championship.

The Strongest won the 1964 Copa Simon Bolívar, which gave it qualification for its first ever continental competition; the 1965 Copa Libertadores, at a time when only national champions entered the tournament. The club achieved Bolivia's first victory outside of the country on a club level, defeating Ecuador's Deportivo Quito. The team finished 2nd in its group that year, behind Argentina's Boca Juniors.

1967–1980: Rafael Mendoza era 
Arguably the greatest president in The Strongest's history, Rafael Mendoza was in charge of the club from 1967 to 1980. In that time, he dealt with the Viloco Tragedy and with many economic hardships, consequent of the political instability of Bolivia and the global economic depression.

One of the greatest achievements was to consolidate the Achumani Sports Complex where the Estadio Rafael Mendoza currently sits. There were many hardships to reach this goal. First, the club had to secure the lands, which were much more extensive than the small lot the club had in Achumani, near the more centrally located Achumani Market. "Don Rafo", in a meeting with other directors, said that now was the time to stop thinking small and start thinking in the future of the team.

The stadium was built and rebuilt (after the river kept eating away at the foundations for some time) from 1974 to 1986. Along with this, the complex was finished including tennis, racquetball, volleyball, and basketball courts. It also has a swimming pool and dining facilities.

"Don Rafo" is best remembered for his hard work in the Achumani Sports Complex. However, he was also one of the few club presidents to put money into the club. Also, in this time, The Strongest achieved great national and international success. Some events to remember in his presidency are the visit by Pelé's Santos team in 1971, an amazing game against Boca Juniors led by Antonio Roma and Silvio Marzolini, and many national championships including the formation of the Bolivian Professional Football League.

1969: The Viloco tragedy
On 24 September 1969, a local holiday, the team was invited to participate in an exhibition game in Santa Cruz organized by the Asociacion Cruceña de Fubol (Santa Cruz's football association); the team had played its last official match on 14 September, and the friendly game was part of a break from their local competition.

On 26 September, the day the team was due to return from Santa Cruz by plane, it was announced that the aircraft, a Lloyd Aéreo Boliviano DC-6 that was carrying twenty members of the team, had disappeared. A day later, there was news that the plane had crashed near Viloco, a rural area between the Tres Cruces Peaks. All sixty-nine passengers, including the entire squad, and five crew members died. The cause of the crash was attributed to pilot error. Luis Gini, Marco Antonio Velasco, and Rolando Vargas didn't board the plane due to their injuries.

Members of the team who died in the crash were:

 Armando Angelacio
 Orlando Caceres
 Hernán Andretta
 Héctor Marchetti

 Eduardo Arrigó
 Raúl Oscar Farfán
 Julio Alberto Díaz
 Oswaldo Franco

 Ernesto Villegas
 Jorge Durán
 Angel Porta
 Juan Iriondo

 Oscar Guzmán
 Jorge Tapia
 Germán Alcázar
 Oscar Flores

 Diógenes Torrico
Eustaquio Ortuño (coach)
José Ayllón Guerra (manager)
Felipe Aguilar (staff)

1977–2013: Inaugural league champion and Tricampeonato 
In 1977, the club was one of the founding members of the Bolivian Professional Football League, and won the first edition. From 1979 to 1981, the club finished as runner-ups three consecutive times. In 1989, they won the league title, and earned the right to play in the Copa Libertadores the following year: the 1990 Copa Libertadores, where the club was eliminated in the second round by Universidad Católica.

In 2003 the club won both tournaments of the year: Apertura and Clausura, becoming the first "Bicampeon" (two-time champion) of the new league format under Argentine manager Néstor Clausen.

The highest achievement in an international competition for The Strongest was achieved in the 2005 Copa Sudamericana, when the squad led by coach Eduardo Villegas eliminated its classic rivals Bolívar 4–2 on aggregate (first and second legs both ended in 2–1 victories). Later, the team went on to defeat Ecuador's LDU Quito  – including a 3–0 victory in Quito. The Strongest was eliminated by Mexican side Pumas UNAM in the third round (round of 16) 4–3 on aggregate, who later went on to become runners-up to cup winners Boca Juniors.

The club became the first "Tricampeon" (three-time champion) of Bolivian football following its 2013 Apertura league title under Bolivian manager Eduardo Villegas. Tigre had previously won the 2012 Apertura and Clausura tournaments.

2014–present: Recent history 
In the 2016 Copa Libertadores, The Strongest made its debut in the competition by historically beating São Paulo at Pacaembu Stadium 1–0 with a goal from Matías Alonso, earning their first Copa Libertadores away win in 34 years. Their last away win in the competition was a 3–2 victory against Técnico Universitario in April 1981. The club eventually placed third in the group with 8 points and 2 wins, 2 draws, and 2 losses.

In 2017 the club had arguably its best ever run in the Copa Libertadores. The club entered the tournament in the second phase and beat Montevideo Wanderers 6–0 on aggregate. In the next phase, it had to face Unión Española, and beat them 6–1 on aggregate, including a 5–0 home victory which equalled their highest international win margin. The club made the group stage, and was drawn with Santos, Independiente Santa Fe, and Sporting Cristal. They began their group stage campaign by beating Santa Fe 2–0 in La Paz. Then they lost their only game of that group, 2–0 against Santos in Brazil. They went on to draw three more games while beating Sporting Cristal 5–1. The club finished second in the group, giving them qualification for the round of 16, where they faced Lanús. The first leg was a 1–1 draw in La Paz, and the second one was a 0–1 win for Lanus in Argentina, so the Bolivian club was narrowly eliminated 2–1 on aggregate.

Kit
The Strongest adopted the yellow and black stripes upon foundation in 1908. While looking for a proper uniform, a friend sent the founders a shirt from Germany that sported a dark green with horizontal, yellow stripes. Upon this, one of the founders commented on how a local bird, the Chayñita, had similar colours. The club adopted the idea and since 1908, the main outfit has been vertically striped yellow and black with a varying number of stripes.

The supplementary uniform has commonly been white with yellow and black, though there have been several other combinations such as a full yellow top and black shorts and even full yellow outfit. More recently, an all black secondary uniform has been adopted for Cup matches.

It is sometimes claimed that the similarity to the kit of Peñarol of Montevideo, Uruguay is due to the fact that The Strongest lacked originality and imitated those colours. However, this theory is countered by the argument that Peñarol did not adopt a full striped kit until the 1911 season, and was an unknown team at the time (won 4 titles in its 24-year existence, up to that point).

Performance in CONMEBOL competitions 
Copa Libertadores: 28 appearances
Best: Second Round in 1990, 1994, 2014, and 2017
1965 – First Round
1971 – First Round
1975 – First Round
1978 – First Round
1980 – First Round
1981 – First Round
1982 – First Round
1987 – First Round
1989 – Group Stage
1990 – Second Round
1994 – Second Round
2000 – Group Stage
2001 – Group Stage
2003 – Group Stage
2004 – Group Stage
2005 – Group Stage
2006 – Group Stage
2012 – Group Stage
2013 – Group Stage
2014 – Round of 16
2015 – Group Stage
2016 – Group Stage
2017 – Round of 16
2018 – Group Stage
2019 – Second stage
2020 – Second Stage
2021 - Group Stage
2022 - Group Stage

Copa Sudamericana: 4 appearances
2003 – Quarter-finals
2005 – Second Round
2011 – First stage
2013 – First stage
2022 – Round of 16

Copa CONMEBOL: 2 appearances
1995 – First Round
1997 – Preliminary Round

Copa Merconorte: 2 appearances
1998 – Group stage
1999 – Group stage

Honours

National honors
División Professional:
Winners (15): 1952, 1964, 1974, 1977, 1986, 1989, 1993, 2003-A, 2003-C, 2004-C, 2011-A, 2012-C, 2012-A, 2013-A, 2016-A
Runners-up (16): 1970,  1979, 1980, 1981, 1988, 1999, 2005-AD, 2015-C, 2016-C, 2017-A, 2017-C, 2018-A, 2018-C, 2019-A, 2019-C, 2022-A

Records and other achievements
 First team to win an organized football Championship in the country (Copa Prefectural 1911, organized by the regional government),
 First team to win an official title (organized by an official football entity) (Campeonato Liga 1914, organized by the LPFA),
 First undefeated champion in the country (1914 League, 6 wins and 1 tie),
 First multiple champion of Bolivian football (six straight league titles after 1916),
 Only team to finish a season with no goals conceded (1930 LPFA Championship),
 Only team to have won all the official titles in an entire decade (between 1916 and 1925),
 Only Bolivian team to win a title in several categories (Champion LPFA 1914 and Champion Second Division 1914),
 First Bolivian team to win a game abroad in an official cup (1–0 in Ecuador against Deportivo Quito for the 1965 Copa Libertadores de América),
 Oldest Bolivian team, reaching the 100-year milestone playing in the top division,
 Oldest and one of two teams (with Oriente Petrolero), to have never been relegated,

Current squad

Notable players
See also :Category:The Strongest players.

Managers

 Ramiro Blacut (1980–81)
 Carlos Aragonés (1992–93)
 Ramiro Blacut (1994)
 Mario Kempes (1999)
 Jorge Habegger (1 July 2000 – 30 June 2001)
 Néstor Clausen (1 January 2004 – 30 June 2004)
 Víctor Hugo Antelo (2004)
 Eduardo Villegas (2005)
 Rolando Chilavert (6 September 2006–06)
 Óscar Carmelo Sánchez (2007)
 Félix Berdeja (2007 – 31 July 2007)
 Eduardo Villegas (2007)
 Bernardo Redín (2008)
 Julio César Toresani (1 January 2009 – 30 May 2009)
 Sandro Coelho (2009–10)
 Néstor Craviotto (1 July 2010 – 30 June 2011)
 Néstor Clausen (15 January 2011 – 15 July 2011)
 Mauricio Soria (21 June 2011 – 19 March 2012)
 Úber Acosta (interim) (20 March 2012 – 23 March 2012)
 Eduardo Villegas (23 March 2012–1?)
 Néstor Craviotto (5 June 2014–15)
 Pablo Caballero (2015–16)
 Mauricio Soria (2016)
 César Farías (2016–2017)
 Carlos Ischia (5 January 2018– 26 March 2018)
 Cesar Farias (26 March 2018– December 2018)
 Pablo Escobar (December 2018– August 2019)
 Mauricio Soria (September 2019 - March 2020)
 Alberto Illanes (April 2020 - April 2021)
 Gustavo Florentin (April 2021 - August 2021)
 Christian Díaz (August 2021–)

See also
 List of accidents involving sports teams

External links

  Official site

References

 
Association football clubs established in 1908
Football clubs in La Paz
Football clubs in Bolivia
1908 establishments in Bolivia